Jurata Pier (Polish: Molo w Juracie) - a wooden pier with a length of 320 metres, located in the southern part of Jurata (on the coast of the Puck Bay). The pier was built in the 1970s. The pier is one of two in Jastarnia. The pier is part of the Międzymorze Promenade.

References

Piers in Poland
Puck County